The Tottenham War Services Institute (TWSI) was founded by a deed of trust in 1920.

Description
The TWSI is a registered charity, entrusted to use its property "as an Institute providing for the use of its members the means of social intercourse, mutual helpfulness, mental and moral improvement, rational recreation, and the other advantages of a Club" for ex-servicemen, their families, and vulnerable members of the wider community.

Location

For many decades until 2008, the building was a British Legion club. Fire destroyed much of the property on 13 October 1987, and the rebuilt structure was reopened on 14 April 1989. From 1995 to 2012, the building's top floors housed an annex of the nearby Tottenham police station. The top floors were home to the Footsteps Vocational Academy (a Pupil Referral Unit), and until April 2017, the Note By Note Music Academy.

But it was most well known for housing the T. Chances community centre (formerly known as Tottenham Chances). Supported by the Reknaw sound system, T. Chances has gained a profile as one of London' major punk rock venues.

Notable figures associated with T. Chances included the musician Captain Rizz, and the poet Xochitl Tuck, who ran regular Survivors Poetry nights at the venue until her death in 2012. 

As of 2020, the TWSI began operating out of the county of Somerset (South West England),  stating on the register of charities held by the Charity Commission of England and Wales: "In 2020 trustees made the decision to move from a London hub to participate in other parts of the country".

In the media
Penny Potter has given several interviews discussing the charity.

The TWSI's property was a topic of discussion in a 16 July 2009 meeting of the Haringey Council.

Key documents

References

Buildings and structures in Tottenham
Charities based in London